The Don Garlits Museum of Drag Racing is located at 13700 SW 16th Ave, Ocala, Florida, just off Interstate 75. Opened in 1984, it chronicles the history of the sport of drag racing. Some 90 racing cars can be seen in the Drag Race building, while a further 50 vehicles are in the Antique Car building. Many of the Garlits "Swamp Rat" cars are here, but he also turns out to be a pack rat with an accumulation of cars and memorabilia from other top names in the sport. The iconic cars of Dean Moon, the Mooneyes gas dragster  and the Moonbeam sports car  are on display.

The museum is home to the International Drag Racing Hall of Fame. Inductees include Art Arfons, Sydney Allard, Zora Arkus-Duntov, Ray Godman, Raymond Beadle, Shirley Muldowney, Kenny Bernstein, Don Schumacher, and Connie Glen Swingle.

See also
Don Garlits
Wally Parks NHRA Motorsports Museum
Petersen Automotive Museum

References

External links

Websites
Don Garlits Museum of Drag Racing (official website)

Automobile museums in Florida
Drag racing organizations
Museums in Marion County, Florida
Buildings and structures in Ocala, Florida
Sports museums in Florida
Museums established in 1984
1984 establishments in Florida